In geometry, the great pentakis dodecahedron is a nonconvex isohedral polyhedron.

It is the dual of the uniform small stellated truncated dodecahedron. The pentagonal faces pass close to the center in the uniform polyhedron, causing this dual to be very spikey. It has 60 intersecting isosceles triangle faces. Part of each triangle lies within the solid, hence is invisible in solid models.

Proportions 
The dihedral angle equals .

References

External links 
 

Dual uniform polyhedra